Grand opera is a genre of 19th-century opera generally in four or five acts, characterized by large-scale casts and orchestras, and (in their original productions) lavish and spectacular design and stage effects, normally with plots based on or around dramatic historic events. The term is particularly applied (sometimes specifically used in its French-language equivalent grand opéra) to certain productions of the Paris Opéra from the late 1820s to around 1850; 'grand opéra' has sometimes been used to denote the Paris Opéra itself.

The term 'grand opera' is also used in a broader application in respect of contemporary or later works of similar monumental proportions from France, Germany, Italy, and other countries.

It may also be used colloquially in an imprecise sense to refer to 'serious opera without spoken dialogue'.

Origins
Paris at the turn of the 19th century drew in many composers, both French and foreign, and especially those of opera. Several Italians working during this period, including Luigi Cherubini, demonstrated that the use of recitative was suited for the powerful dramas that were being written. Others, such as Gaspare Spontini, wrote works to glorify Napoleon. These operas were composed on a suitably grand scale for the Emperor. Other factors which led to Parisian supremacy at operatic spectacle was the ability of the large Paris Opéra to stage sizeable works and recruit leading stage-painters, designers and technicians, and the long tradition of French ballet and stagecraft. The first theatre performance ever lit by gas, for example, was Aladin ou La lampe merveilleuse at the Opéra in 1823; and the theatre had on its staff the innovative designers Duponchel, Cicéri and Daguerre.

Several operas by Gaspare Spontini, Luigi Cherubini, and Gioachino Rossini can be regarded as precursors to French grand opera. These include Spontini's La vestale (1807) and Fernand Cortez (1809, revised 1817), Cherubini's Les Abencérages (1813), and Rossini's Le siège de Corinthe (1827) and Moïse et Pharaon (1828). All of these have some of the characteristics of size and spectacle that are normally associated with French grand opera. Another important forerunner was Il crociato in Egitto by Meyerbeer, who eventually became the acknowledged king of the grand opera genre. In Il crociato, which was produced by Rossini in Paris in 1825 after success in Venice, Florence and London, Meyerbeer succeeded in blending Italian singing-style with an orchestral style derived from his German training, introducing a far wider range of musical theatre effects than traditional Italian opera. Moreover, Il crociato with its exotic historical setting, onstage bands, spectacular costumes and themes of culture clash, exhibited many of the features on which the popularity of grand opera would be based.

What became the essential features of 'grand opéra' were foreseen by Étienne de Jouy, the librettist of Guillaume Tell, in an essay of 1826:

Division into five acts seems to me the most suitable for any opera that would reunite the elements of the genre: [...] where the dramatic focus was combined with the marvellous: where the nature and majesty of the subject [...] demanded the addition of attractive festivities and splendid civil and religious ceremonies to the natural flow of the action, and consequently needed frequent scene changes.

France

The first grand operas (1828–1829)

The first opera of the grand opera canon is, by common consent, La muette de Portici (1828) by Daniel François Auber. This tale of revolution set in Naples in 1647 (and ending with an eruption of Mount Vesuvius into which the heroine precipitates herself), embodied the musical and scenic sensationalism which were to be grand opera's hallmark. The libretto for La muette was by Eugène Scribe, a dominant force in French theatre of the time who specialized in melodramatic versions (often involving extremes of coincidence) of historical topics which were well-tailored for the public taste of the time. This was his first libretto for the Opéra; he was to write or be associated with many of the libretti of the most successful grand operas which followed. La muettes reputation was enhanced by its being the touchpaper for a genuine revolution when it was produced in Brussels in 1830.

In 1829, this was followed by Rossini's swansong Guillaume Tell. The resourceful Rossini, having largely created a style of Italian opera to which European theatre had been in thrall, recognized the potential of new technology, larger theatres and orchestras and modern instrumentation, and proved in this work that he could rise to meet them in this undoubted grand opera. However, his comfortable financial position, and the change in political climate after the July Revolution, persuaded him to quit the field, and this was his last public composition.

The golden age of grand opera: 1830–1850
After the Revolution, the new regime determined to privatize the previously state-run Opéra and the winner of the contract was a businessman who acknowledged that he knew nothing of music, Louis-Désiré Véron. However, he soon showed himself extremely shrewd at discerning public taste by investing heavily in the grand opera formula. His first new production was a work long contracted from Meyerbeer, whose premiere had been delayed by the Revolution. This was fortunate for both Véron and Meyerbeer. As Berlioz commented, Meyerbeer had "not only the luck to be talented, but the talent to be lucky." Meyerbeer's new opera Robert le diable chimed well with the liberal sentiments of 1830s France. Moreover, its potent mixture of melodrama, spectacle, titillation (including a ballet of the ghosts of debauched nuns), and dramatic arias and choruses went down extremely well with the new leaders of taste, the affluent bourgeoisie. The success of Robert was as spectacular as its production.

Over the next few years, Véron brought on Auber's Gustave III (1833, libretto by Scribe, later adapted for Verdi's Un ballo in maschera), and Fromental Halévy's La Juive (1835, libretto also by Scribe), and commissioned Meyerbeer's next opera Les Huguenots (1836, libretto by Scribe and Deschamps), whose success was to prove the most enduring of all grand operas during the 19th century.

Having made a fortune in his stewardship of the Opéra, Véron cannily handed on his concession to Henri Duponchel, who continued his winning formula, if not to such financial reward. Between 1838 and 1850, the Paris Opéra staged numerous grand operas of which the most notable were Halévy's La reine de Chypre (1841) and Charles VI (1843), Donizetti's La favorite and Les martyrs (1840) and Dom Sébastien (1843, librettos by Scribe), and Meyerbeer's Le prophète (1849) (Scribe again). 1847 saw the premiere of Giuseppe Verdi's first opera for Paris, Jérusalem, an adaptation, meeting the grand opera conventions, of his earlier I Lombardi alla prima crociata.

For production statistics of grand opera in Paris, see List of performances of French grand operas at the Paris Opéra.

Ballet in grand opera
A notable feature of grand opera as it developed in Paris through the 1830s was the presence of a lavish ballet, to appear at or near the beginning of its second act. This was required, not for aesthetic reasons, but to satisfy the demands of the Opera's wealthy and aristocratic patrons, many of whom were more interested in the dancers themselves than in the opera, and did not want their regular meal-times disturbed. The ballet therefore became an important element in the social prestige of the Opéra. Composers who did not comply with this tradition might suffer as a consequence, as did Richard Wagner with his attempt to stage a revised Tannhäuser as a grand opera in Paris in 1861, which had to be withdrawn after three performances, partly because the ballet was in act 1 (when the dancers' admirers were still at dinner).

Grand operas of the 1850s and 1860s
The most significant development—indeed transformation—of grand opera after the 1850s was its handling by Giuseppe Verdi, whose Les vêpres siciliennes (1855), proved to be more widely given in Italy and other Italian-language opera houses than in France. The taste for luxury and extravagance at the French theatre declined after the 1848 revolution, and new productions on the previous scale were not so commercially viable. The popular Faust (1859) by Charles Gounod started life as an opéra comique and did not become a grand opera until rewritten in the 1860s. Les Troyens by Hector Berlioz (composed 1856–1858, later revised), was not given a full performance until nearly a century after Berlioz had died—although portions had been staged before—but the spirit of this work is far removed from the bourgeois taste of the grand opera of the 1830s and 1840s.

By the 1860s, taste for the grand style was returning. La reine de Saba by Charles Gounod was rarely given in its entirety, although the big tenor aria, "Inspirez-moi, race divine", was a popular feature of tenor recitals. Meyerbeer died on 2 May 1864; his late opera, L'Africaine, was premiered posthumously in 1865. Giuseppe Verdi returned to Paris for what many see as the greatest French grand opera, Don Carlos (1867). Ambroise Thomas contributed his Hamlet in 1868, and finally, at the end of the decade, the revised Faust was premiered at the Opéra in its grand opera format.

Late French grand operas

During the 1870s and 1880s, a new generation of French composers continued to produce large-scale works in the tradition of grand opera but often broke its melodramatic boundaries. The influence of Wagner's operas began to be felt, and it is a moot point whether these works can be simply called grand opera. Jules Massenet had at least two large scale historical works to his credit, Le roi de Lahore (Paris, 1877, assessed by Grove as "the last grand opera to have a great and widespread success".) and Le Cid (Paris, 1885). Other works in this category include Polyeucte (Paris, 1878) by Charles Gounod and Henry VIII by Camille Saint-Saëns (Paris, 1883). Ernest Reyer had started to compose his Sigurd years earlier, but, unable to get it premiered in Paris, settled for La Monnaie in Brussels (1884). What may have been one of the last successful French grand operas was by an unfamiliar composer, Émile Paladilhe: Patrie! (Paris, 1886). It ran up nearly 100 performances in Paris, and quite a few in Belgium, where the action takes place, but has since disappeared without a trace.

Decline of French grand opera
The expensive artifacts of grand opera (which also demanded expensive singers)—Les Huguenots was known as 'the night of the seven stars' because of its requirement of seven top-grade artistes—meant that they were economically the most vulnerable as new repertoire developed. Hence they lost pride of place at the Paris Opéra (especially when many of the original stage sets were lost in fire in the late 19th century). However, as late as 1917, the Gaîté-Lyrique devoted an entire season to the genre, including Halévy's La reine de Chypre.

French grand opera today
Some of these works – Guillaume Tell, La favorite, Les vêpres siciliennes and Don Carlos, for instance – continue to have a place in the operatic repertoire. Even the pieces that are rarely staged are increasingly being resuscitated for compact disc recordings, and many are revived at opera festivals and by companies such as Palazetto Bru Zane.

After virtually disappearing from the operatic repertory worldwide in the 20th century, Meyerbeer's major grand operas are once again being staged by leading European opera houses.

Grand opera outside France

Italy
French grand opera was generally well received in Italy, where it was always performed in Italian translation.

Italian operas with their own ballet started to become relatively common in the late 1860s and 1870s. Some of these, such as Il Guarany by the Brazilian composer Antônio Carlos Gomes were designated as "opera ballo" (i.e. 'danced opera'). Others, such as La Gioconda by Amilcare Ponchielli were not, although they qualified for the description. They constituted an evolution of grand opera.

Verdi's Aida, despite having only four acts, corresponds in many ways to the grand opera formula. It has a historical setting, deals with 'culture clash' and contains several ballets as well as its extremely well known Grand March. It was a huge success, both at its world premiere in Cairo in 1871 and its Italian premiere in Milan in 1872. It led to an increase in the scale of some of the works by other composers that followed it. This was particularly noticeable in works by Gomes (Fosca in 1873, and his Salvator Rosa in 1874); Marchetti (especially Gustavo Wasa in 1875); Ponchielli: (I Lituani in 1874) and La Gioconda (Milan, 1876, revised 1880)); and Lauro Rossi (La Contessa di Mons, premiered in Turin in 1874).

Other operas on this scale continued to be composed by Italian composers during the 1880s and even 1890s, but with less frequency; examples being Marchetti's Don Giovanni d'Austria (1880) and Ponchielli's Il figluol prodigo (also 1880).

Germany

French grand operas were regularly staged by German opera houses; an early article by Richard Wagner depicts German opera managers hurrying to Paris to try to identify the next hit. The Dresden performances of Le prophète (in German) in 1850 were the occasion for a series of articles by Wagner's disciple, Theodor Uhlig, condemning Meyerbeer's style and crudely attributing his alleged aesthetic failure to his Jewish origins, inspiring Wagner to write his anti-Jewish diatribe Das Judenthum in der Musik ("Jewishness in Music").

Meyerbeer himself was German by birth, but directed nearly all his mature efforts to success in Paris. Richard Wagner's Rienzi, the composer's first success (produced Dresden, 1842) is totally Meyerbeerean in style. Wagner was at that time a sincere admirer of the older composer, who assisted him in arranging performances of Rienzi and Der fliegende Holländer in Dresden and Berlin. As described above, Wagner attempted in 1860/1861 to recast Tannhäuser as a grand opera, and this Paris version, as later adapted for Vienna, is still frequently produced today. Götterdämmerung, as noted by George Bernard Shaw, shows clear traces of some return by Wagner to the grand opera tradition, and a case could also be argued for Die Meistersinger von Nürnberg.

Meyerbeer's only mature German opera, Ein Feldlager in Schlesien is in effect a Singspiel, although act 2 has some of the characteristics of grand opera, with a brief ballet and an elaborate march. The opera was eventually transformed by the composer to L'étoile du nord.

In many German-language houses, especially in Vienna, where Eduard Hanslick and later Gustav Mahler championed Meyerbeer and Halévy respectively, the operas continued to be performed well into the 20th century. The growth of anti-Semitism in Germany, especially after the Nazi Party obtained political power in 1933, spelled the end of the works of these composers on German stages until modern times when La Juive, Les Huguenots, Le prophète and L'Africaine have been revived.

North America
The first American grand opera, Leonora, was written by the American composer William Fry for Ann Childe Seguin to take the title role in the 1840s.

Citations

General bibliography 
 Bartlet, M. Elizabeth C.: "Grand opéra" in The New Grove Dictionary of Opera, 2: 512–517, ed. Stanley Sadie, Macmillan Publishers, London, 1992 
 Charlton, David: "On the nature of 'grand opera'", pp. 94–105 in Hector Berlioz: Les Troyens, ed. Ian Kemp, Cambridge University Press, 1988 
 Charlton, David, editor: The Cambridge Companion to Grand Opera, Cambridge University Press, 2003 
 Crosten, William Loren: French Grand Opera: an Art and a Business, King's Crown Press, 1948. 
 Cruz, Gabriela: Grand Illusion: Phantasmagoria in Nineteenth-Century Opera, Oxford University Press, 2020 
 Gerhard, Anselm: The Urbanization of Opera: Music Theater in Paris in the Nineteenth Century, University of Chicago Press, 1998 
 Huebner, Steven: French Opera at the Fin de Siècle: Wagnerism, Nationalism, and Style, Oxford University Press, 1999 
 Pendle, Karin: Eugène Scribe and French Opera in the Nineteenth Century, UMI Research Press, Ann Arbor, 1979 
 Soubies, Albert: Soixante-sept Ans a L'Opéra en une Page, 1826–1893, Paris, 1893 
 Warrack, John; West, Ewan, editors: "Grand Opera" in The Oxford Dictionary of Opera, Oxford University Press, 1992 
 Wolff, Stéphane: L'Opéra au Palais Garnier (1875–1962), Paris, Deposé au journal L'Entr'acte [1962] . Reprint: Slatkine, 1983 

 
Opera genres
Opera history
Opera terminology